A full list of models produced by Italian automobile manufacturer Fiat since 1899. The list is compiled by year and order of distribution:

Current models

Historic models

1980-2021

 2009-2018 Fiat 500 - South America
 2016-2020 Fiat 500X - South America
 2017-2020 Fiat 124 Spider - North America
 2002-2012 Fiat Albea
 1981-1985 Fiat Argenta
 1995-2005 Fiat Barchetta
 2007-2014 Fiat Bravo
 1995-2001 Fiat Bravo/Brava
 2000-2002 Fiat Brava - South America
 1991-1998 Fiat Cinquecento
 1980-1987 Fiat City - South America
 1993-2000 Fiat Coupé
 1998-1999 Fiat Coupé - South America
 1985-1996 Fiat Croma
 2005-2010 Fiat Croma II
 1985-2000 Fiat Duna/Prêmio/Elba
 1997-2016 Fiat Ducato II - South America
 1977-1988 Fiat Fiorino I - South America
 1988-2013 Fiat Fiorino II - South America
 1988-1998 Fiorino pickup - South America
 2011-2017 Fiat Freemont - South America
 2016-2019 Fiat Fullback
 2012-2018 Fiat Grand Siena
 2012-2018 Fiat Grand Siena - South America
 2005-2018 Fiat Grande Punto
 2003-2012 Fiat Idea
 2005-2016 Fiat Idea - South America
 2007-2016 Fiat Linea
 1996-2002 Fiat Marea
 1998-2010 Fiat Multipla
 1983-1985 Fiat Oggi
 1996-2016 Fiat Palio
 1997-2019 Palio Weekend / Weekend - South America
 1986-2003 Fiat Panda II
 1980-1986 Fiat Panorama
 1993-2018 Fiat Punto
 1983-1990 Fiat Regata
 2005-2014 Fiat Sedici
 1997-2010 Fiat Seicento
 1996-2016 Fiat Scudo
 1996-2016 Fiat Siena
 2001-2007 Fiat Stilo
 1997-2020 Fiat Strada I - South America
 1990-1997 Fiat Tempra
 1988-1995 Fiat Tipo
 1994-2010 Fiat Ulysse
 1983-1995 Fiat Uno
 2010-2021 Fiat Uno II - South America
 1984-2014 Fiat Uno/Mille - South America
 2012-2017 Fiat Viaggio
 2016-2019 Fiat Fullback
 2016-2020 Fiat Talento

1950-1979

 1950-1958 Fiat 1400
 1951-1973 Fiat Campagnola
 1952-1954 Fiat 8V
 1952-1958 Fiat 1900
 1953-1969 Fiat 1100/103
 1955-1969 Fiat 600
 1957-1961 Fiat 1200
 1957-1975 Fiat 500
 1959-1966 Fiat 1200/1500/1600 Cabriolet
 1959-1968 Fiat 1800
 1959-1961 Fiat 2100
 1961-1967 Fiat 1300
 1961-1967 Fiat 1500
 1961-1969 Fiat 2300
 1964-1973 Fiat 850
 1966-1974 Fiat 124
 1967-1975 Fiat 124 Sport Coupé
 1966-1985 Fiat 124 Sport Spider
 1966-1973 Fiat Dino
 1967-1972 Fiat 125
 1969-1985 Fiat 128
 1969-1977 Fiat 130
 1971-1983 Fiat 127
 1972-2000 Fiat 126
 1972-1981 Fiat 132
 1972-1982 Fiat X1/9
 1974-1984 Fiat 131
 1974-1982 Fiat 133
 1976-1987 Fiat 147
 1978-1988 Fiat Ritmo/Strada

1920-1949
 1920-1925 Fiat 510
 1921-1923 Fiat 520 "Superfiat"
 1923-1926 Fiat 502
 1922-1927 Fiat 519
 1925-1929 Fiat 509
 1926-1927 Fiat 503
 1926-1927 Fiat 507
 1926-1928 Fiat 512
 1927-1930 Fiat 520
 1928-1931 Fiat 521
 1928-1931 Fiat 525
 1929-1932 Fiat 514
 1931-1935 Fiat 515
 1931-1933 Fiat 522
 1931-1934 Fiat 524
 1932-1937 Fiat 508 Balilla
 1933-1938 Fiat 518 Ardita
 1934-1936 Fiat 527
 1935-1950 Fiat 1500
 1936-1955 Fiat 500 "Topolino"
 1937-1939 Fiat 508 C
 1938-1944 Fiat 2800
 1939-1953 Fiat 1100

1899–1919
 1899-1900 Fiat 4 HP
 1900-1901 Fiat 6 HP
 1901 Fiat 8 HP
 1901 Fiat 10 HP
 1901-1902 Fiat 12 HP
 1903-1906 Fiat 16-20 HP
 1901-1905 Fiat 24-32 HP
 1904-1906 Fiat 60 HP
 1905-1908 Fiat Brevetti
 1908-1910 Fiat 1
 1912-1915 Fiat Zero
 1912-1920 Fiat 2B
 1915-1920 Fiat 70
 1919-1926 Fiat 501
 1919-1925 Fiat 505

Light commercial vehicles
 1957-1971 Fiat 1100 T
 1965-1983 Fiat 238
 1965-1974 Fiat 241
 1974-1987 Fiat 242
 1976-1985 Fiat 900T
 1978-1983 Fiat Daily
 1977-2007 Fiat Fiorino
 1979-2001 Fiat Marengo
 1985-2000 Fiat Penny

External links

List of Fiat models since 1899 (fr)

 
Fiat